Oakwood is a neighborhood located in east central Staten Island, New York City, near the South Shore. It is bordered by Tysens Lane (north); the Atlantic Ocean (east); Great Kills Park (south); Kensico Street, and Clarke Avenue (west).

The neighborhood has a coastline on the Lower New York Bay; the coastal area is sometimes referred to as Oakwood Beach, and is the site of a sewage treatment facility.  Bordering this facility on the south is the Staten Island Unit of the Gateway National Recreation Area, also known locally (and formerly, officially) as Great Kills Park.

Oakwood's ZIP Code is 10306, served by a post office in New Dorp, the community's northern neighbor.

History

Dominated by farmland in the heights area, and an ocean resort in the beach area until the mid-20th century, Oakwood started suburbanization when a Staten Island Tunnel was proposed to connect to the New York City Subway. Development was rapid after the Verrazzano-Narrows Bridge opened in November 1964. Today, Oakwood is a middle-class neighborhood of one- and two-family homes and garden apartments, with important commercial establishments along Hylan Boulevard.

Oakwood Beach underwent massive damage during Hurricane Sandy in late October 2012. A year later, due to the damage and low elevation, neighborhood homeowners were given the option of government buyouts, which would leave the area as a vacant buffer zone for future storms.

Points of interest
Points of interest located in Oakwood include Monsignor Farrell High School and a string of cemeteries on the neighborhood's southwest side, most notably Frederick Douglass Memorial Park, an African-American burial ground – an anomaly as very few African-Americans actually reside in Oakwood or any of the neighborhoods that surround it.  Historic Richmond Town lies immediately to the west.

The greenbelt woods located along Riedel Avenue have some concrete artifacts (such as a piece of sidewalk located near the pond at Riedel and Thomas Street), and pieces of the Great Depression can be occasionally found along the trails, such as bricks or chimneys or foundations of houses that were once located in the area, when it was still rural.  The trails along Riedel Avenue, once planned for the Willowbrook Parkway, also contain large boulders dropped off from glacial retreat during the ice age (though many are painted red due to vandals).

Amundsen Circle

Amundsen Circle (officially Captain Roald Amundsen Plaza) is a traffic circle and  park bounded by Amboy Road, Clarke Avenue and Savoy Street.  Amundsen Circle and the  Amundsen Trail for joggers both commemorate explorer Roald Amundsen.  The park was acquired by the city in 1928, and named on July 9, 1929.  In the park, there is a stone plaque, erected in 1933, when there was a large Norwegian population in Oakwood, by the Norsemen Glee Club of Staten Island and the Norwegian Singing Society of Brooklyn.  The park is maintained by the Richmond Ever-Green Garden Club.

Public transportation
The Staten Island Railway serves the neighborhood at its eponymous station. Oakwood Heights' bus service is provided by the  local buses and the  express buses.

References

Neighborhoods in Staten Island
Populated coastal places in New York (state)
Managed retreat